Janice Heather Jarratt (born 22 October 1958) is an Australian politician. She was a teacher specialising in children with learning difficulties before entering parliament. A member of the Labor Party, she was elected to the Legislative Assembly of Queensland for the seat of Whitsunday in 2001. She was appointed Parliamentary Secretary to the Minister for Primary Industries and Fisheries on 13 September 2006 by Premier Peter Beattie. She served on the front bench for all of Anna Bligh's term. She was Parliamentary Secretary to the Minister for Tourism, Regional Development and Industry from 2007 to 2009, when she became Parliamentary Secretary to the Minister for Employment. In February 2011, she was promoted to the ministry as Minister for Tourism, Manufacturing and Small Business. In March 2012, Labor was swept out of power at an election that also cost Jarratt her seat.

References

1958 births
Living people
Members of the Queensland Legislative Assembly
Australian Labor Party members of the Parliament of Queensland
21st-century Australian politicians
21st-century Australian women politicians
Women members of the Queensland Legislative Assembly